

This is a list of the National Register of Historic Places (NRHP) designated in northern Worcester County, Massachusetts.  It includes listings from all Worcester County communities through which Massachusetts Route 2 passes, and those that lie to their north.  This includes the communities of Ashburnham, Ashby, Athol, Fitchburg, Gardner, Harvard, Lancaster, Leominster, Lunenburg, Phillipston, Royalston, Templeton, Westminster, and Winchendon.  National Register listings for other communities in the county are listed elsewhere.

Cities and towns in northern Worcester County

|}

See also
List of National Historic Landmarks in Massachusetts

References

Buildings and structures in Worcester County, Massachusetts
Worcester